No Good Deeds is a book written by Laura Lippman and published by HarperCollins in 2006, which won the Anthony Award for Best Novel in 2007.

References 

Anthony Award-winning works
American mystery novels
American crime novels
2006 American novels